Olof "Olle" Mattias Wästberg (born 6 May 1945) is a Swedish journalist, politician and diplomat, who formerly served as Director-General of the Swedish Institute. 

Olle Wästberg was born in Stockholm, the son of Erik Wästberg and his wife Greta née Hirsch, and is the younger brother of Per Wästberg. He received a Candidate of Philosophy in political science and economic history from Stockholm University in 1972. He is married to Inger Claesson-Wästberg with whom he has two children.

Wästberg started his political career in the Liberal Youth of Sweden, where he served as Secretary-General from 1966 to 1969. He worked as an editorial writer in Expressen from 1969 to 1971. He was an elected Member of Parliament for the Liberal People's Party from 1976 to 1982. During his time as an MP he was noted for his criticism towards the Fälldin government during the Telub affair in 1981. From 1983 to 1991 Wästberg was CEO of the company Dagspressens marknadsinformation AB. From 1991 to 1993 he served as State Secretary at the Swedish Ministry of Finance under Minister for Finance Anne Wibble. In 1993 Wästberg became editor-in-chief of Expressen, but was fired in 1995 after a conflict with the Bonnier family owners.

From 1999 to 2004 Wästberg served as Consul-General of Sweden in New York City. He was appointed as Director-General of the Swedish Institute on 1 March 2005. He has written many articles and books on New York and in 2005 he nominated its former mayor Rudy Giuliani for the Nobel Peace Prize for his efforts to severely reduce crime rates in the city.

References

Sources
 Judisk Krönika, 1–1999

External links
Olle Wästberg – personal website

1945 births
Jewish Swedish politicians
Living people
Stockholm University alumni
Members of the Riksdag from the Liberals (Sweden)
Members of the Riksdag 1979–1982
Swedish journalists
Consuls-general of Sweden
Swedish Jews